Hrazdan may refer to:
Hrazdan, a city in Armenia
Hrazdan (river) in Armenia
Hrazdan stadium, a soccer stadium in Yerevan, Armenia
Geghashen, Armenia
Masis (city), Armenia